Milan Anđelković (born 1 September 1981) is a retired Slovenian football defender.

External links

 Player profile at NZS 
 

1981 births
Living people
Footballers from Ljubljana
Slovenian footballers
Association football defenders
NK Ljubljana players
NK Bela Krajina players
NK IB 1975 Ljubljana players
NK Celje players
NK Olimpija Ljubljana (2005) players
A.S.G. Nocerina players
Ethnikos Achna FC players
Olimpia Grudziądz players
FC St. Veit players
U.S. Triestina Calcio 1918 players
NK Radomlje players
Slovenian Second League players
Slovenian PrvaLiga players
Serie C players
Cypriot First Division players
I liga players
Slovenian expatriate footballers
Slovenian expatriate sportspeople in Italy
Expatriate footballers in Italy
Slovenian expatriate sportspeople in Cyprus
Expatriate footballers in Cyprus
Slovenian expatriate sportspeople in Poland
Expatriate footballers in Poland
Slovenian expatriate sportspeople in Austria
Expatriate footballers in Austria
Slovenia youth international footballers
Slovenia under-21 international footballers
Slovenian football managers